Concannon Vineyard is the second-largest winery in the Livermore Valley of California, producing around 30,000 cases annually. It is well known for its Petite Sirah and Concannon was the first winery to bottle this grape as a varietal wine in 1961. Prior to 1961, the petite sirah grape was produced worldwide as a blend wine. It also produces several other varieties of wine, including Chardonnay and Cabernet Sauvingnon. Concannon is owned by The Wine Group.

History
Concannon was founded in 1883 by an Irish immigrant, James Concannon of Inishmaan, County Galway. James imported a group of cuttings from Chateau Margaux in 1893. James planted a large area of his Livermore vineyard solely with the imported vines. In the 1960s, most of the California vintners were confronted with an attack of phylloxera  Closer inspection revealed that the vines descended from the 1893 cuttings looked healthy, while those that were at least partly derived from other grapes appeared to have been preferentially attacked by the virus.

In 1965, Jim Concannon, who was then in charge of Concannon's research and development, contacted Dr. Harold Olmo at UC Davis about establishing a program to clone some of the 1893 vines at Concannon's Livermore Vineyard. Dr. Olmo, Professor Curt Alley and Jim Concannon prepared a test bed where they could closely monitor specimens of the grapes descended from these wines. The three collaborators then took three cuttings from a single vine  The vine specimens were heat treated to remove any trace of viral disease, then propagated under close observation at the Oakville Campus of UC Davis. UC Davis formally registered the wines to the wine industry under their code names between 1970 and 1974. This research program is credited with creating Concannon Cabernet Clones 7, 8 and 11, which now account for an estimated 80% of all cabernet sauvignon produced in the state of California.  According to UC Davis,  Its success in producing and selling sacramental or altar wine for the Roman Catholic Church helped it to survive national Prohibition. Grape cuttings from this vineyard were introduced to Mexico between 1889 and 1904 for the improvement of its commercial viticulture. As such, the vineyard has been designated a California Historical Landmark (#641).

Concannon Vineyard was bought by Tesla Vineyards, an investment group that also owned the Wente Vineyards in 1992. The investment group included members of the Tesla family. In July 1992, The Wine Group reportedly bought the Concannon operation from Tesla for an undisclosed price. At the time, Concannon reportedly was producing about 55,000 cases a year.

Notes

See also
 Uí Díarmata

References

External links

 Photographs and transcription of historical marker - Markeroni.com
 "John Concannon of Concannon Vineyard - the IntoWine interview." IntoWine December 2, 2012. Accessed November 28, 2018.

Wineries in Livermore Valley
Companies based in Livermore, California
1883 establishments in California